The U.S. unincorporated territory of Guam first required its residents to register their motor vehicles and display license plates in 1916.

Guam adopted these standards in 1960.

Passenger baseplates

1947 to 1964

1965 to present
Since 1996, all passenger plates have featured a round mounting hole at the top right and horizontal slots in the other three corners, as with plates of Hawaii and the Northern Marianas.

Coding

Passenger, 1994
On the 1994 base, the letters of passenger plate serials indicated the village of issuance. These three-letter codes were displayed in a smaller font size than was the numerical portion of the plate serial.

On the 2009 base, the letters of passenger plate serials again indicate the village of issuance. These two-letter codes are displayed in the same font size as is the numerical portion of the plate serial.

Non-passenger
On the 1994 base, commercial truck plates were coded by location of issuance, but using a different geographical coding system than for passenger plates. These codes were based on more specific geographical areas or geographical features, rather than political jurisdictions.

Bus, dealer, taxi, and trailer plates were coded only by type, not location of issuance.

Optional plates

Other plates

References

External links
 Plateshack.com - Guam Y2K

+Guam
Guam-related lists